Mongolia competed at the 2008 Asian Beach Games held in Bali, Indonesia from October 18, 2008 to October 26, 2008. Mongolia finished with 1 gold medal.

Nations at the 2008 Asian Beach Games
2008
Asian Beach Games